Zachrysia auricoma is a species of air-breathing land snail, terrestrial pulmonate gastropod mollusks in the family Zachrysiidae.

Distribution 
This terrestrial snail occurs in Cuba.

This species has not yet become established in the USA, but it is considered to represent a potentially serious threat as a pest, an invasive species which could negatively affect agriculture, natural ecosystems, human health or commerce. Therefore it has been suggested that this species be given top national quarantine significance in the USA.

References

 Thompson, F. G. (2011). An annotated checklist and bibliography of the land and freshwater snails of México and central America. Florida Museum of Natural History Bulletin. 50(1): 1-299.

External links
 Férussac, A.E.J.P.F. d'Audebard de. (1821-1822). Tableaux systématiques des animaux mollusques classés en familles naturelles, dans lesquels on a établi la concordance de tous les systèmes; suivis d'un Prodrome général pour tous les mollusques ou fluviatiles, vivantes ou fossiles. Paris, 1821 et 1822.

Stylommatophora
Gastropods described in 1821
Endemic fauna of Cuba